Delvon Randall is an American football safety for the Orlando Predators of the National Arena League (NAL). He played college football for the Temple Owls.

Early years
Randall was born in Pittsburgh, Pennsylvania and attended Gateway High School. He played wide receiver in high school under head coach, Don Militzer.

Professional career

Philadelphia Eagles
On April 28, 2019, Randall signed as an undrafted free agent with the Philadelphia Eagles of the National Football League (NFL). On May 3, 2019, Randall was released by the Eagles.

Ottawa Redblacks
On January 31, 2020, Randall signed with the Ottawa Redblacks of the Canadian Football League (CFL). On January 11, 2021, Randall was released by the Redblacks.

Orlando Predators
On March 25, 2022, Randall signed with the Orlando Predators of the National Arena League (NAL). On October 31, 2022, Randall re-signed with the Predators for the 2023 season.

References

Players of American football from Pennsylvania
Living people
Year of birth missing (living people)
American football safeties
Temple Owls football players
Philadelphia Eagles players
Ottawa Redblacks players